Sveti Pavel may refer to:

 Prebold, a settlement in the Municipality of Prebold, Slovenia, known as Sveti Pavel pri Preboldu until 1952
 Šentpavel na Dolenjskem, a settlement in the Municipality of Ivančna Gorica, Slovenia, known as Sveti Pavel until 1955
 Sveti Pavel (novel), a novel by Pavle Zidar